The following events occurred in October 1981:

October 1, 1981 (Thursday)
The first cellular telephone system was inaugurated. Nordic Mobile Telephone (Nordisk MobilTelephoni, NMT) set up the network in Sweden.
Eighty-three people were killed and more than 300 injured when a car bomb exploded outside of the Beirut headquarters of the Palestine Liberation Organization's intelligence center. The Front for the Liberation of Lebanon from Foreigners, which the PLO asserted was a front for Israel, claimed it carried out the attack.
Gunther Guillaume, whose unmasking as an East German spy brought down the government of West German chancellor Willy Brandt in 1974, was released from prison and allowed to cross into East Germany.
The first five percent of President Reagan's 25% cut of U.S. federal income taxes took effect. The next 10% would take effect July 1, 1982, and the final 10% on July 1, 1983.
Led by Dr. Paul L. Schechter, astronomers at the Kitt Peak National Observatory reported the discovery of a "hole" in the universe, 300 million light years in diameter, that had only one-tenth of the stars and galaxies found elsewhere. The void, described by Schechter as "exceedingly hard to understand", is beyond the constellation Boötes and encompasses one percent of the space in the known universe.

October 2, 1981 (Friday)
The Ayatollah Ali Khamenei was elected president of Iran with 16,007,972 votes out of 16,846,996 cast. Education minister Ali-Akbar Parvaresh placed second.
U.S. president Ronald Reagan announced his plans to resurrect the B-1 bomber program that had been scrapped by President Carter, with 100 of the planes to be built by 1987, and another plan to deploy 100 MX missiles.
Died: 
Harry Golden, 79, American journalist
Hazel Scott, 61, American jazz singer and pianist

October 3, 1981 (Saturday)
The hunger strike at Maze Prison was called off after seven months by Sinn Féin, the political arm of the Irish Republican Army. Ten IRA prisoners had died, while another seven had given up fasting. The decision, made by prisoner Brendan McFarlane, ended the fasting for the remaining six IRA strikers. Three days later, Secretary of State for Northern Ireland James Prior announced that some of the original demands of the strikers, including the right to not wear prison uniforms, would be granted.
Born: Zlatan Ibrahimović, Swedish footballer, in Malmö

October 4, 1981 (Sunday)
The body in Lee Harvey Oswald's grave was exhumed at the Rose Hill Cemetery in Fort Worth, Texas to determine whether the corpse was indeed Oswald's. Michael Eddowes, author of the 1977 book The Oswald File, paid the $250,000 expense for the body removal and its examination at the Baylor University Medical Center. Oswald's dental records were examined and confirmed that his was indeed the body in the grave. The examining team wrote a detailed account of the examination two years later.

October 5, 1981 (Monday)
The last model of the Triumph Motor Company's sports cars, a 1982 Triumph TR7, rolled off of the assembly line at Solihull, West Midlands, England.
 The North–South Summit, officially the International Meeting on Cooperation and Development, opened in Cancun, Mexico, gathering 22 heads of state, including Zhao Ziyang (China), F. Mitterrand (France), Indira Gandhi (India), Jose Lopez Portillo (Mexico), King Fahd (Saudi Arabia), Margaret Thatcher (UK), Ronald Reagan (USA), and UN Secretary-General Kurt Waldheim.

October 23, 1981 (Friday)
Egyptian surgeon Ayman al-Zawahiri was arrested during a roundup of dissidents following the assassination of Anwar Sadat. Zawahiri spent three years in prison, where he was tortured. "The torture broke Zawahiri," noted one author later, "and transformed him as well into an embittered fanatic, determined to inflict deadly harm on Egypt's secular authorities and its Western friends."
The Spider, the first lunar module to be tested in outer space for docking with a lunar orbiter, fell out of orbit and burned up in the Earth's atmosphere. During the Apollo 9 mission, on March 7, 1969, the craft had been operated by astronauts Jim McDivitt and Rusty Schweickart, a mission that confirmed that a module could carry out the necessary docking and undocking maneuvers needed for a lunar landing.
Born: Michael Fishman, American child actor (D.J. Conner on Roseanne), in Los Angeles
Died: Reg Butler, 69, English sculptor

October 24, 1981 (Saturday)
A weekend of anti-nuclear protests began in cities throughout Europe, as 200,000 marched in Rome and another 150,000 in London to protest the deployment of American Pershing II missiles at bases in five European nations. On Sunday, a crowd of 200,000 turned out in Brussels for the largest demonstration since World War II, and smaller crowds marched in Paris, Berlin and Oslo.
Born: Tila Tequila, Vietnamese American model and singer, as Tila Nguyen, in Singapore
Died: Edith Head, 84, American costume designer and eight-time Oscar winner

October 25, 1981 (Sunday)
Guernica, the classic 1937 painting by Pablo Picasso, arrived at the Prado Museum in Madrid on Picasso's 100th birthday.
Born: Shaun Wright-Phillips, English footballer, in Greenwich
Died: 
Pete Reiser, 62, American baseball outfielder
Ariel Durant, 83, American historian

October 26, 1981 (Monday)
In the worst accident since refugees from Caribbean nations began sailing to the United States, a leaky sailboat with 67 Haitians broke apart in rough seas, half a mile from the beach in Florida. Thirty-four survivors were able to swim to safety, while the bodies of 33 drowning victims washed ashore at Hillsboro Beach, Florida.
The longest-serving president of Finland, Urho Kekkonen, resigned because of ill health after nearly 26 years in office.
Born: Guy Sebastian, Australian singer, in Klang, Malaysia

October 27, 1981 (Tuesday)
The Swedish government did not allow the vessel to leave until November 6.
The first reported instance of a pilot being blinded by a laser pointed from the ground took place 700 feet over Encino, California. A 21-year-old man who said he was "testing a laser for a Halloween party" aimed the beam into the cockpit of a hovering police helicopter, leaving the pilot and co-pilot with total loss of vision for several seconds.

October 28, 1981 (Wednesday)
The Los Angeles Dodgers won the 1981 World Series over the New York Yankees in six games. After dropping the first two games, the Dodgers won the next four, including the clincher, 9–2, at Yankee Stadium.
The heavy metal band Metallica was formed after Lars Ulrich called James Hetfield, whom he had met through a classified ad in a Los Angeles weekly, The Recycler, to ask his help in recording a song for a compilation album. Ron McGovney and Dave Mustaine completed the group.
President Reagan successfully lobbied the United States Senate to vote down a resolution that would have blocked the sale of five AWACS radar planes to Saudi Arabia for $8.5 billion. The House had already voted to block the sale, 301–111, on October 14, and 50 senators had co-sponsored a resolution against the deal. Lobbying by Reagan and by the U.S. Department of Defense persuaded five senators to change their minds.
Born: Milan Baroš, Czech Republic soccer football player, in Valašské Meziříčí

October 29, 1981 (Thursday)
Near Meeteetse, Wyoming, biologist Dennie Hammer found the first live black-footed ferret (Mustela nigripes) since 1975, when the species was believed to have become extinct. The month before, a dog had brought back a dead ferret, prompting the search. Hammer placed a radio tag on the animal, which led scientists to find other ferrets and led to the repopulation of the species.
Iranian foreign minister Mir-Hossein Mousavi was elected as the 79th prime minister of Iran on a second ballot by the Majlis, receiving a majority 115 of the 202 votes, with 39 against and 48 abstentions.
The situation comedy Gimme a Break! began a six-season run on American television, as one of the few new hit shows of the 1981–82 season.
Born: 
Jonathan Brown, Australian rules football player (Brisbane Lions), in Colac, Victoria
Amanda Beard, American swimmer (Olympic gold medalist 1996 and 2004), in Newport Beach, California
Died: Georges Brassens, 60, French singer and songwriter

October 30, 1981 (Friday)
Thirty-eight years after he disappeared while flying a dive bomber, the body of U.S. Navy Lt. Lorne Parker Pelzer and his airplane were discovered in a remote canyon near California's Mount Shasta. Pelzer had been alone in Douglas SBD Dauntless on March 13, 1943 when the airplane vanished in a blizzard.
Venera 13 was launched by the Soviet Union, followed five days later by Venera 14. The twin satellite explorers traveled to the surface of Venus, with Venera 13 landing first on March 1, 1982, and transmitting the first color pictures of the reddish brown soil on the second planet.
Born: 
Ivanka Trump, American model, businesswoman, and daughter of U.S. president Donald Trump; in New York City
Jun Ji-hyun, South Korean actress, in Seoul, South Korea
Died: Lew Jenkins, 64, former world lightweight boxing champion

October 31, 1981 (Saturday)
Without permission, Tom Crotser dug through walls at Mount Pisgah in Jordan, where he claimed that he and a team had discovered the Ark of the Covenant. Though he did not bring the artifact out, he presented photographs. Biblical scholar Siegfried Horn reviewed Crotser's evidence and, in an article in the Biblical Archaeology Review, concluded that the nails and metal covering shown in photographs were of recent origin.
Robb Weller led an audience in a performance of "The Wave" at a University of Washington football game in Seattle. Although both Weller and Krazy George Henderson claim to have invented the Wave (with Henderson having led it on October 15), the Seattle event has been said to have popularized it.
Born:  Frank Iero, American musician, in Belleville, New Jersey; Mike Napoli, American baseball first baseman, in Hollywood, Florida

References

1981
1981-10
October 1981 events
1981-10